27 (twenty-seven; Roman numeral XXVII) is the natural number following 26 and preceding 28.

In mathematics 

 Twenty-seven is a cube of 3: . 27 is also 23 (see tetration). There are exactly 27 straight lines on a smooth cubic surface, which give a basis of the fundamental representation of the E6 Lie algebra. 27 is also a decagonal number.
 27 is the value of the expression , where .
 In decimal, it is the first composite number not divisible by any of its digits.
 It is the radix (base) of the septemvigesimal positional numeral system.
 In decimal, 27 is the only positive integer that is three times the sum of its digits.
 In the Collatz conjecture (aka the " conjecture"), a starting value of 27 requires 111 steps to reach 1, more than any number smaller than it.
 The unique simple formally real Jordan algebra, the exceptional Jordan algebra of self-adjoint 3 by 3 matrices of quaternions, is 27-dimensional.
 In decimal, it is a Smith number and a Harshad number.
(3.141592653589793238462643383279...). If one starts counting with 0, it is one of few known self-locating strings in pi.
 In decimal, 27 is the sum of the numbers between and including its digits.
 There are 27 sporadic groups, if the Tits group is included.
 If one cyclically rotates the digits of a three-digit number that is a multiple of 27, the new number is also a multiple of 27. For example, 378, 783, and 837 are all divisible by 27.
 Any multiple of 27 with "000" or "999" inserted yields another multiple of 27. For example, 20007, 29997, 50004, and 59994 are all multiples of 27.
 Any multiple of 27 can be mirrored and spaced with a zero each for another multiple of 27. For example, 27 and 702, 54 and 405, and 378 and 80703 are all multiples of 27.
 In senary, one can readily test for divisibility by 43 (decimal 27) by seeing if the last three digits of the number match 000, 043, 130, 213, 300, 343, 430, or 513.
 27 is divisible by the number of prime numbers below it, nine.

In science
The atomic number of cobalt.
The atomic weight of the only stable isotope of aluminum.
Dark matter is thought to make up 27% of the universe.
 27 is the number of bones in the human hand.

Astronomy
The Messier object M27, a magnitude 7.5 planetary nebula in the constellation Vulpecula, also known as the Dumbbell Nebula.
The New General Catalogue object NGC 27, a spiral galaxy in the Andromeda constellation.
The Saros number of the solar eclipse series, which began on March 9, 1993 BCE and ended on April 16, 713 BCE. The duration of Saros series 27 was 1,280.1 years, and it contained 72 solar eclipses. Further, the Saros number of the lunar eclipse series, which began on July 28, 1926 BCE and ended on January 23, 411 BCE. The duration of Saros series 27 was 1532.5 years, and it contained 86 lunar eclipses.

Electronics
The type 27 vacuum tube (valve), a triode introduced in 1927, was the first tube mass-produced for commercial use to incorporate an indirectly heated cathode.  This made it the first vacuum tube that could function as a detector in AC-powered radios.  Prior to the introduction of the 27, home radios were powered by a set of three or more storage batteries with voltages of 3 volts to 135 volts.

In language and literature
The number of letters in the Spanish alphabet.
The number of books in the New Testament.
 The total number of letters in the Hebrew alphabet (22 regular letters and 5 final consonants).
 Alternate name for The Hunt, a book by William Diehl.
 Abbé Faria's prisoner number in the book The Count of Monte Cristo.
 In Stephen King's novel It, It returns every 27 years to Derry.

In astrology
27 Nakṣatra or lunar mansions in Hindu astrology.

In art

Movies
Summer, or 27 Missing Kisses
Chapter 27-I
27 Dresses
Number 27 (written by Michael Palin)

Music
"27", a song by Fall Out Boy on the album Folie à Deux
"27", a song by Passenger on the album Whispers
"27", a song by Title Fight on the album Shed.
"27", a song by Biffy Clyro on the album Blackened Sky
"27", a song on Machine Gun Kelly's album Bloom
"27 Jennifers", a song by Mike Doughty on the album Rockity Roll
27, an album by South Korean singer Kim Sung-kyu
27, an album by Argentine rock band Ciro y los Persas
Twenty-Seven, an album by The Adicts.
French rapper Kaaris' signature number is 27, from his zip code 93270.
"Twenty Seven Strangers" by Villagers.
27, a Boston-based band
27, an opera by composer Ricky Ian Gordon and librettist Royce Vavrek 
27 Club, a list of popular musicians, artists, or actors who died at age 27
"Weird Al" Yankovic has a recurring joke involving the number 27, which is used in several songs.

Other
The Minneapolis-based artist Deuce 7 (a.k.a. Deuce Seven, Twenty Seven, 27).

In sports
 The value of all the colors in snooker add up to 27.
 The number of outs in a regulation baseball game for each team at all adult levels, including professional play, is 27.
 The New York Yankees have won 27 World Series championships, the most of any team in the MLB.

In other fields 
Twenty-seven is also:
 A-27, American attack aircraft.
 The code for international direct-dial phone calls to South Africa.
 The name of a cigarette, Marlboro Blend No. 27.
 The number of the French department Eure.
 One of the anthropomorphic math symbols Lisa Simpson imagines talking to her in The Simpsons episode "Girls Just Want to Have Sums", which, instead of offering the expected pun-based aphorism, rather unhelpfully only says "twenty seven".
 Number of planets needed to fuel the Reality Bomb in the episodes "The Stolen Earth" and "Journey's End" of Doctor Who (series 4).

See also
 List of highways numbered 27
 List of highways numbered 27A

References

 Wells, D. The Penguin Dictionary of Curious and Interesting Numbers London: Penguin Group. (1987), p. 106.
 Mystery of the number 27 - Large collection of 27 related trivia and facts.
 Prime Curios! 27 from the Prime Pages
 The 27 Project - collection of 27 sightings in movies, TV, culture and art

Integers